London County Council cottage estates are estates of council houses, built by London County Council, in the main between 1918 and 1939.

Council-built housing
The City of London Corporation built tenements in the Farringdon Road in 1865, but this was an isolated instance. The first council to build housing as an integrated policy was Liverpool Corporation, starting with St Martin's Cottages in Ashfield Street, Vauxhall, completed in 1869. That year a Royal Commission was held, as the state had taken an interest in housing and housing policy. This led to the Housing of the Working Classes Act 1890, which encouraged the London authority to improve the housing in their areas. It also gave them the power acquire land and to build tenements and houses (cottages). As a consequence London County Council opened the Boundary Estate in 1900, a block dwelling estate of tenements in Tower Hamlets.

The first four cottage estates were at Norbury, Old Oak, Totterdown Fields and White Hart Lane.

Homes fit for heroes – interwar policy
In 1912 Raymond Unwin, published a pamphlet Nothing gained by Overcrowding. The First World War indirectly provided a new impetus, when the poor physical health and condition of many urban recruits to the army was noted with alarm. This led to a campaign known as Homes fit for heroes. In 1919 the Government, through the Housing Act 1919 required councils to provide housing built to the Tudor Walters standards, helping them to do so through the provision of subsidies,

London County Council embraced these freedoms and planned 8 cottage estates in the peripheries of London: Becontree, St Helier, Downham, Watling for example; seven further followed including Bellingham. Houses were built on green field land on the peripheries of urban London. 

The Addison Act provided subsidies solely to local authorities and not to private builders. Many houses were built over the next few years in cottage estates. Following the Geddes Axe of 1922, the Housing, &c. Act 1923 (Chamberlain Act) of 1923 stopped subsidies going to council houses but did extend subsidies to private builders.

The first Labour government took office in 1924. The Wheatley Act of 1924 restored subsidies to municipal housing but at a lower level, it failed to make any provision for the lower paid, who were living in the worse conditions, and could not afford to pay the higher rents of the new houses, or to travel to work in Central London from these new peripheral estates. 

Examples of these were built at the Downham Estate in London, Blocks of flats were also built.

Design of the estates
This was dictated by the topology and the desired densities.

Design of the houses

Most of the houses were brick built, but due to the shortage of bricks and wood in the early 1920s, and the availability of factories tooled up for war work some interesting experimental designs and prefabrications.

Furnishing the house
An advertisement offering to complete furnish an Atholl all-steel house in Downham for £78.17.11d, gave a full list of what was needed.

See also
 List of the 19 LCC cottage estates 
 List of large council estates in the UK
 Housing in the United Kingdom
 Public housing ("projects")

References
Footnotes

Notes

 Bibliography
 
 

 
 
 
 
 
 
 
 
 
 

House types
Public housing in the United Kingdom
Housing in the United Kingdom